is a Japanese-born fashion designer and artist based in Paris.

Biography  
Hideki Seo graduated from the Royal Academy of Fine Arts, Antwerp after studying visual design at the Kyoto University of Art.

He worked as the assistant designer for Azzedine Alaïa in Paris as well as developing his career as an artist. His artworks have been shown in various museums throughout Europe and America in recent years.

Exhibitions  
2015 -		Solo exhibition “ON MY WAY – HIDEKI SEO” projects+gallery (Saint-Louise, US)

2013 -  	 “A queen within”, World chess hall of fame (Saint-Louise, US)
 Launch of “A queen within” at Christy’s New York
  “Rooms 27” ( Tokyo )
  “50 years birthday of Antwerp fashion”, at Mode museum (Antwerp)
  “ARRRGH!” Monsters in Fashion”, Centraal Museum (Netherlands)
  “ARRRGH!” Monstres de Mode”, La Gaîté Lyrique (Paris)

2012	- Solo exhibition “Hideki Seo”, Galerie Papelart (Paris)

2011 - “ARRRGH! Monsters in Fashion” by Vasilis Zidianakis of ATOPOS at Benaki Museum (Athens)

2005		- Loveless (Tokyo)
  Rooms 10 (Tokyo)
  Labels inc. (Antwerp)
  Francis (Antwerp)
  Nieuwe Ontwerpers (Rotterdam)
  Side by Side in Laforet Harajuku (Tokyo)

2004	- Usage Externe deux, Collaboration with Kart Stallaert (Brussels)

Awards 

 Laureate Prize of the magazine Week-end Knack
 Laureate Grand Prize of ‘Perfume project IFF New York’
 Laureate  Fashion week Brussels, Grand Prize by magazine Le Vif/L’Express

Publications 
 HIDEKI SEO (2014)

References

External links 
 http://www.hidekiseo.net

1974 births
Living people